Shir Ahan (also Romanized as Shīr Āhan; also known as Shīr Āhan-e Bīsheh and Shīrāhan-e Bīsheh) is a village in Kangan Rural District, in the Central District of Jask County, Hormozgan Province, Iran. At the 2006 census, its population was 59, in 11 families.

References 

Populated places in Jask County